Johnny Flynn (born 1983) is a British musician and actor.

Johnny Flynn may also refer to:

Johnny Flynn (footballer) (born 1989)

See also 
Jonny Flynn (born 1989), basketball player